The women's 1500 metres speed skating competition of the 2010 Winter Olympics in Vancouver was held at the Richmond Olympic Oval on 21 February 2010.

Records
Prior to this competition, the existing world and Olympic records were as follows.

No new world or Olympic records were set during this competition. Ireen Wüst did equal the track record of 1:56.89 set by Christine Nesbitt on 18 October 2009.

Results

References

External links
 2010 Winter Olympics results: Ladies' 1500 m, from http://www.vancouver2010.com/; retrieved 2010-02-20.

Women's speed skating at the 2010 Winter Olympics